Oxalyldihydrazide is an organic compound with the formula of NH2NHCOCONHNH2. Oxalyldihydrazide can act as a ligand on some divalent first row transition metals manganese, iron, cobalt, nickel, copper or zinc.

References

Hydrazides